A carbon dioxide recorder (or CO2 recorder) is a machine that can record the level of carbon dioxide at different times. It is more sophisticated than a carbon dioxide detector which only has to indicate the presence of carbon dioxide. There are three main types of carbon dioxide recorder: chemical, physical, and electrical.

Mechanism

Chemical
The chemical carbon dioxide recorder, sucks the gas through a chemical that absorbs carbon dioxide. They include the Simmance combustion recorder; Hays automatic CO2 recorder, and electroflo CO2 recorder.

The Arndt carbon dioxide recorder used a potassium hydroxide solution to absorb carbon dioxide.

The Uehling recorder uses the chemical, sodium hydroxide to absorb the carbon dioxide, and measures the change in volume of the gas.

Physical
The physical carbon dioxide recorder, includes Webster CO2 recorder. The Remarex carbon dioxide recorder uses vanes spinning in the gas under test and the air.

Electrical
Electrical recorders use a thermal conductivity method, where the resistance of a heated wire is measured.

Form
Carbon dioxide recorders can be handheld, or wall mount. They can have an audible or light indicator alarm if level is too high. Units can also measure humidity and temperature.

Application
Carbon dioxide recorders have been used in schools and hospitals to determine whether enough fresh air is being circulated. A carbon dioxide recorder can be used to measure the composition of flue gas to check if combustion is at its most efficient. In agriculture, they can be used to measure levels of carbon dioxide in greenhouses, where the levels are deliberately elevated.

References

Gas sensors
Carbon dioxide